Long Walk to Freedom is an autobiographical work written by Nelson Mandela. 

Long Walk to Freedom may also refer to:

Long Walk to Freedom (album), a 2006 album by Ladysmith Black Mambazo
Mandela: Long Walk to Freedom, a 2013 biographical film about Nelson Mandela